The 2020 Utah wildfire season was a series of prominent wildfires throughout the state of Utah, lasting from June 1 through October 30, as defined by state law. Part of the 2020 Western United States wildfire season, Utah saw record-breaking numbers of human-caused fires. The largest fire of the season, the East Fork Fire, burned an area of 89,568 acres. In total, the suppression costs for the fires amounted to at least $103 million (2020 USD).

Of the 1,547 fires in Utah during 2020, 1,202 (78%) were human-caused, surpassing 2015's record of 937. These fires accounted for nearly 100,000 of the 329,732 total acres burned during this season. The significant rise in human-caused fires was attributed to the COVID-19 pandemic, as it forced recreation outside at higher rates.

Background 
On May 27, Utah observed 237 wildfires (of which 95% were human-caused); a near fourfold increase compared to the previous season's 67 wildfires recorded at that same date. Throughout the early season, record-breaking numbers of fires (especially human-caused) exceeded previous season equivalents. This, coupled with an abnormally hot and dry spring led fire officials, meteorologists, and hydrologists to believe that the season would be unusually active.

List of wildfires 

See also
 2020 Western United States wildfire season
 COVID-19 pandemic in Utah

References

External links
https://gacc.nifc.gov/gbcc/predictive/products/gbytd-byState.htm - GBCC Great Basin data
https://utahfireinfo.gov/active-wildfires - Active wildfires in Utah
https://gacc.nifc.gov/sacc/predictive/intelligence/NationalLargeIncidentYTDReport.pdf - Database for large incidents (wildfires, NIFC. Renews annually.)

2020 Utah wildfires
Wildfires in Utah